Discography 1991–1993 is a compilation album released in 1994 by American powerviolence band Dropdead on Armageddon. The album consists of songs from previously released EPs.

Track list

References

1994 compilation albums
Dropdead albums